Tinea incognita or Tinea incognito is a fungal infection of the skin masked and often exacerbated by application of a topical immunosuppressive agent. The usual agent is a topical corticosteroid. As the skin fungal infection has lost some of the characteristic features due to suppression of inflammation, it may have a poorly defined border and florid growth. Occasionally, secondary infection with bacteria occurs with concurrent pustules and impetigo.

Signs and symptoms

Cause 
The use of a topical steroid is the most common cause. Frequently, a combination topical steroid and antifungal cream is prescribed by a physician. These combinations include betamethasone dipropionate and clotrimazole (trade name Lotrisone) and triamcinolone acetonide and clotrimazole. In areas of open skin, these combinations are acceptable in treating fungal infection of the skin.  In areas where the skin is occluded (groin, buttock crease, armpit), the immunosuppression by the topical steroid might be significant enough to cause tinea incognita to occur even in the presence of an effective antifungal.

Diagnosis 
Clinical suspicion arises especially if the eruption is on the face, ankle, legs, or groin. A history of topical steroid or immunosuppressive agent is noted. Confirmation is with a skin scraping and either fungal culture or microscopic exam with potassium hydroxide solution. Characteristic hyphae are seen running through the squamous epithelial cells.

Treatment 
The removal of the offending topical steroid or immunosuppressive agent and treatment with a topical antifungal is often adequate.  If the tinea incognita is extensive or involves hair bearing areas, treatment with a systemic antifungal may be indicated.

References

Animal fungal diseases
Mycosis-related cutaneous conditions